Hue is an unincorporated community in Swan Township, Vinton County, Ohio, in the United States.

History
A post office was established at Hue in 1882, and remained in operation until 1907.

References

Populated places in Vinton County, Ohio